"Champagne Life" is the second single from American singer Ne-Yo's fourth studio album, Libra Scale. The song premiered on radio on June 5, 2010.

Background
The song's producer D. DoRohn Gough said about working with Ne-Yo on the song: "My desire is to influence a culture with music that feels good. I am honored that Ne-Yo is allowing me to display this music on a global stage.".

Music video
The video premiered on July 14, 2010 along with the video for "Beautiful Monster". The video shows Ne-Yo to be a part of a crime fighting group that's living the life with money, women and fame. Narratively, it is the first of a thematic trilogy of music videos, followed by the videos for "One in a Million" and "Beautiful Monster".

Remix
An unofficial remix was released with Fabolous & Rick Ross.

Critical reception
Rap-Up magazine said that "Ne-Yo pops the cork and toasts to the good life on 'Champagne Life'". [He] evokes his idol Michael Jackson on the slinky production, which goes down smoothly". Mark Edward Nero from About.com praised the song, saying that it's "a Michael Jackson-esque tune about enjoying the type of life where "trouble is a bubble in a champagne glass" and "dreams and reality are one and the same". He also said that the song is catchier than "Beautiful Monster".

Live performances
Ne-Yo performed "Champagne Life" at Power 106's Powerhouse 2010 concert at the Honda Center in Anaheim, California, on June 19, 2010.

Charts

Weekly charts

Year-end

Radio and release information

Radio adds

Purchaseable release

References

2010 singles
2010 songs
Ne-Yo songs
Def Jam Recordings singles
Songs written by Ne-Yo
Music videos directed by Wayne Isham